Selby is a city in Walworth County, South Dakota, United States. The population was 610 at the 2020 census. It is the county seat of Walworth County.

History
Selby sprang up with the arrival of the Chicago, Milwaukee, St. Paul and Pacific Railroad to the area in 1899. The town was named for a railroad official.

Geography
Selby is located at  (45.505692, -100.031369).

Selby has been assigned the ZIP code 57472.

Climate

Demographics

2010 census
At the 2010 census there were 642 people in 300 households, including 175 families, in the city. The racial makup of the city was 96.7% White, 2.0% Native American, and 1.2% from two or more races. Hispanic or Latino of any race were 0.5%.

Of the 300 households 19.0% had children under the age of 18 living with them, 51.3% were married couples living together, 4.7% had a female householder with no husband present, 2.3% had a male householder with no wife present, and 41.7% were non-families. 39.0% of households were one person and 22.6% were one person aged 65 or older. The average household size was 1.98 and the average family size was 2.62.

The median age was 52.9 years. 16% of residents were under the age of 18; 3.4% were between the ages of 18 and 24; 18.7% were from 25 to 44; 27.8% were from 45 to 64; and 34.1% were 65 or older. The gender makeup of the city was 51.2% male and 48.8% female.

2000 census
At the 2000 census, there were 736 people in 308 households, including 199 families, in the city. The population density was 882.7 people per square mile (342.4/km). There were 335 housing units at an average density of 401.8 per square mile (155.8/km). The racial makup of the city was 98.10% White, 1.36% Native American, 0.14% from other races, and 0.41% from two or more races. Hispanic or Latino of any race were 0.27% of the population.

Of the 308 households 23.4% had children under the age of 18 living with them, 57.1% were married couples living together, 5.8% had a female householder with no husband present, and 35.1% were non-families. 34.1% of households were one person and 21.4% were one person aged 65 or older. The average household size was 2.16 and the average family size was 2.74.

The age distribution was 20.4% under the age of 18, 3.4% from 18 to 24, 20.5% from 25 to 44, 25.3% from 45 to 64, and 30.4% 65 or older. The median age was 51 years. For every 100 females, there were 92.7 males. For every 100 females age 18 and over, there were 86.6 males.

The median household income was $27,639 and the median family income  was $37,500. Males had a median income of $26,563 versus $18,214 for females. The per capita income for the city was $16,433. About 4.7% of families and 8.3% of the population were below the poverty line, including 2.6% of those under age 18 and 16.1% of those age 65 or over.

References

	

Cities in Walworth County, South Dakota
Cities in South Dakota
County seats in South Dakota